Sandi Bird Sanctuary is a bird sanctuary in Hardoi district of Uttar Pradesh, India.

The sanctuary is located at a distance of 19 km on Hardoi-Sandi Road in Sandi in Hardoi district of Uttar Pradesh. Sandi Bird Sanctuary is 1 km from Sandi town on Main Road at Nawabganj, near Sandi Police Station of Hardoi district.

Sandi Bird sanctuary was created in the year 1990 in order to protect the natural habitats and aquatic vegetation for the local residents and migratory birds. It has been designated as a protected Ramsar site since September 2019. The Sandi Bird sanctuary is also known by its ancient name as "Dahar Jheel" (Jheel = Lake). The lake's area is 309 ha (3.09 km²). River Garra, formerly known as Garun Ganga, passes near the sanctuary.

Migratory birds rest on the banks of the river before reaching the Sandi Bird sanctuary. The migratory birds begin to arrive at the sanctuary at the beginning of winter in the month of November. Sandi is a tourist As a tourist destination and is of particular interest to birdwatchers. The best time to visit the sanctuary is from December to February. The nearest railway station is at Hardoi (19 km).

In the past, the rare Siberian white crane Grus leucogeranus has been seen here, and some scientists believe it returns under the right circumstances.

References

Bird sanctuaries of Uttar Pradesh
Ramsar sites in India
Hardoi district
2019 establishments in Uttar Pradesh
Protected areas established in 2019